Bicet is a surname. Notable people with the surname include:

Frank Bicet (born 1971), Cuban-Spanish discus thrower
Noleysi Bicet (born 1981), Cuban hammer thrower
Nora Aída Bicet (born 1977), Spanish-Cuban javelin thrower
Yusmay Bicet (born 1983), Cuban triple jumper